Weißig is a municipal subdivision of Freital in Sächsische Schweiz-Osterzgebirge district. It consists of two other villages, Oberweißig and Unterweißig.

History 
The village was first mentioned in 1235. Since 1 January 1974, Weißig has been a municipal subdivision of Freital.

Population

External links 

 Website of Weißig (German)
 Weißig in Historisches Ortsverzeichnis von Sachsen (German)

References 

Former municipalities in Saxony
Freital